Trachelospermum jasminoides is a species of flowering plant in the family Apocynaceae, native to eastern and southeastern Asia (Japan, Korea, southern China and Vietnam). Common names include Confederate jasmine, southern jasmine, star jasmine, Confederate jessamine, and Chinese star jasmine.

This plant, and the variegated cultivar 'Variegatum', have gained the Royal Horticultural Society's Award of Garden Merit.

Description
When they meet a wet surface, they emit aerial weed roots, otherwise they surround the support (they are twining). If cut, like most Apocynaceae, they exude a white latex, resembling sticky milk. Young twigs, initially pubescent, become glabrous with age. Dark green in summer, the leaves turn bronze in winter.

Inflorescence
The fragrant flowers are white,  diameter, with a tube-like corolla opening out into five petal-like lobes. The white, rotate actinomorphic flowers have a calyx formed by five narrow, smooth, reflexed sepals 2−5 mm , much shorter than the corolla tube. The latter has a dilated tube in the middle, 5−10 mm long, terminating in 5 obliquely bypassed lobes, all curved, resembling a helix turning counterclockwise. The five stamens are inserted in the middle of the corolla tube. The ovary is formed of a style and two carpels, with five glands at its base. They are grouped in paniculate, terminal and axillary cymes.

Cultivation
Trachelospermum jasminoides is commonly grown as an ornamental plant and houseplant. In gardens, public landscapes, and parks it is used as a climbing vine, a groundcover, and a fragrant potted plant on terraces and patios. It will flower in full sun, partial shade, or total shade, and requires well-drained soil (if constantly kept damp it may succumb to fungal infection), moderate water, moderate fertilizer, and a climbing structure (whether a trellis or another plant is secondary). Propagation is most commonly done with cuttings/clones.

It is widely planted in California and also particularly in the Southeastern United States, where its hardiness is confined to USDA Zones 8–10. It is debated however, where the common name for this plant, Confederate jasmine, comes from. While some dictionaries (such as Merriam-Webster and dictionary.com) suggest that the name comes from the plant's common cultivation in the southern United States, others argue that the term actually comes from Malaysia, and the former Malay confederacy. It gets another of its common names, trader's compass, from an old Uzbekistan saying that it pointed traders in the right direction, provided they were of good character. It is also called star jasmine in Europe and Chinese jasmine or Chinese ivy in Asia.

Its irritating, milky latex-like sap makes it resistant to the depredations of Australian possums.

Uses
A valuable perfume oil is extracted from the steam distilled or tinctured flowers and used in high end perfumery. 
In a dilute form, tinctured flowers are much used in Chinese, Vietnamese and Thai incenses. A bast fibre is produced from the stems.

Chemical constituents
Six indole alkaloids; ibogaine, coronaridine, voacangine, apparicine, conoflorine, and 19-epi-voacangarine have been reported.

Gallery

References

External links

 Star Jasmine
 Clemson University: Jasmine

Apocyneae
Flora of Asia
Medicinal plants
Garden plants of Asia
Groundcovers
Vines
Plants described in 1846